Zeno of Elea was a pre-Socratic Greek philosopher of Magna Graecia and a member of the Eleatic School founded by Parmenides.  Plato and Aristotle called him the inventor of the dialectic. He is best known for his paradoxes.

Life 
Little is known for certain about Zeno's life. The primary source of biographical information about Zeno is Plato's dialogue Parmenides, which recounts a fictionalized account of a visit that Zeno and Parmenides made to Ancient Athens in 450 BC, at a time when Parmenides is "about 65", Zeno is "nearly 40", and Socrates is "a very young man". Assuming an age for Socrates of around 20 and taking the date of Socrates' birth as 469 BC gives an approximate date of birth for Zeno of 490 BC. Plato says that Zeno was "tall and fair to look upon" and was "in the days of his youth … reported to have been beloved by Parmenides".

According to Sir William Smith, in the Dictionary of Greek and Roman Biography and Mythology (1870)

Other perhaps less reliable details of Zeno's life are given by Diogenes Laërtius in his Lives and Opinions of Eminent Philosophers, where it is reported that he was the son of Teleutagoras, but the adopted son of Parmenides, was "skilled to argue both sides of any question, the universal critic", and that he was arrested and perhaps killed at the hands of a tyrant of Elea. 

According to Diogenes Laërtius, Zeno conspired to overthrow Nearchus the tyrant. Eventually, Zeno was arrested and tortured. According to Valerius Maximus, when he was tortured to reveal the name of his colleagues in conspiracy, Zeno refused to reveal their names, although he said that he did have a secret that would be advantageous for Nearchus to hear. When Nearchus leaned in to listen to the secret, Zeno bit his ear. He "did not let go until he lost his life and the tyrant lost that part of his body." Within Men of the Same Name, Demetrius said that the nose was bitten off instead. According to the 10th-century Suda, while "Zeno was being interrogated by him, he took his own tongue between his teeth, gnawed it off, and spat it upon the tyrant", and "afterward he was thrown into a mortar and crushed and beaten to a pulp".

Zeno may have also interacted with other tyrants. According to Laërtius, Heraclides Lembus, within his Satyrus, these events occurred against Diomedon instead of Nearchus. Valerius Maximus recounts a conspiracy against the tyrant Phalaris, but this would be impossible as Phalaris had died before Zeno was even born. According to Plutarch, Zeno attempted to kill the tyrant Demylus. After failing, he had "with his own teeth bit off his tongue, he spit it in the tyrant’s face".

Works
According to Plato, Zeno wrote a book of paradoxes, however, this has unfortunately not survived. Plato says that Zeno's writings were "brought to Athens for the first time on the occasion of" the visit of Zeno and Parmenides. Plato also has Zeno say that this work "meant to protect the arguments of Parmenides", was written in Zeno's youth, stolen, and published without his consent. Plato has Socrates paraphrase the "first thesis of the first argument" of Zeno's work as follows: "If being is many, it must be both like and unlike, and this is impossible, for neither can the like be unlike, nor the unlike like."

The main sources on the nature of Zeno's arguments on motion come from Aristotle's Physics.  and the commentary on that work by Simplicius of Cilicia.

Zeno's paradoxes 

Zeno's paradoxes have puzzled, challenged, influenced, inspired, infuriated, and amused philosophers, mathematicians, and physicists for over two millennia. According to Proclus in his Commentary on Plato's Parmenides, Zeno produced "not less than forty arguments revealing contradictions", but only nine are now known. The most famous are the arguments against motion described by Aristotle in his Physics, Book VI.

Legacy 
Zeno's arguments are perhaps the first examples of a method of proof called reductio ad absurdum, literally meaning to reduce to the absurd. Parmenides is said to be the first individual to implement this style of argument.  This form of argument soon became known as the epicheirema. In Book VII of his Topics, Aristotle says that an epicheirema is "a dialectical syllogism". It is a connected piece of reasoning which an opponent has put forward as true. The disputant sets out to break down the dialectical syllogism. This destructive method of argument was maintained by him to such a degree that Seneca the Younger commented a few centuries later: "If I accede to Parmenides there is nothing left but the One; if I accede to Zeno, not even the One is left."

Bertrand Russell described Zeno's paradoxes as "immeasurably subtle and profound".

Zeno is also regarded as the first philosopher who dealt with the earliest attestable accounts of mathematical infinity.

See also

Notes

References

Further reading
 Barnes, Jonathan. 1982. The Presocratic Philosophers. 2d ed. London: Routledge & Kegan Paul.
 Lewis, Eric. 1999. "The Dogmas of Indivisibility: On the Origins of Ancient Atomism. In Proceedings of the Boston Area Colloquium in Ancient Philosophy. Vol. 14. Edited by John J. Cleary and Gary M. Gurtler, S. J., 1–21. Leiden, The Netherlands: Brill.
 McKirahan, Richard. 2001. "Zeno’s Dichotomy in Aristotle." Philosophical Inquiry 23.1–2: 1–24.
 Navia, Luis. E. 1993. The Presocratic Philosophers: An Annotated Bibliography. New York and London: Garland.
 Owen, G. E. L. 1958. "Zeno and the Mathematicians." Proceedings of the Aristotelian Society 58:199–222.
 Papa-Grimaldi, Alba. 1996. "Why Mathematical Solutions of Zeno’s Paradoxes Miss the Point: Zeno’s One and many Relation and Parmenides’ Prohibition." Review of Metaphysics 50.2: 299–314.
 Sainsbury, Mark. 1988. Paradoxes. Cambridge: Cambridge University Press.
 Salmon, Wesley C., ed. 1970. Zeno’s Paradoxes. Indianapolis, IN, and New York: Bobbs-Merrill.
 Vlastos, Gregory. 1967. "Zeno of Elea." In The Encyclopedia of Philosophy. Vol. 8. Edited by Paul Edwards, 369–379. New York and London: Macmillan.
 White, Michael J. 1992. The Continuous and the Discrete: Ancient Physical Theories from a Contemporary Perspective. Oxford: Clarendon.

External links 

 
 
 
 Zeno's Paradoxes
 
 
 Plato's Parmenides.
 Aristotle's Physics.
 
 Fragments of Zeno

490s BC births
430s BC deaths
5th-century BC Greek people
5th-century BC philosophers
Ancient Greek epistemologists
Ancient Greek logicians
Ancient Greek metaphysicians
Ancient LGBT people
Eleatic philosophers
Lucanian Greeks
Philosophers of Magna Graecia